Driss Basri (8 November 1938 in Settat – 27 August 2007) was a Moroccan politician who served as interior minister from 1979 to 1999. After General Oufkir's death in 1972, and then Ahmed Dlimi's death in 1983, Driss Basri became  Hassan II's right-hand man and number two of the regime from the beginning of the 1980s to the end of the 1990s. His name has been associated with the Years of Lead.<ref name=RFI>Mort de Driss Basri, symbole des années de plomb, RFI (audio interviews of Basri) </ref>

Mohammed VI's decision to end his functions in 1999 increased, for a while, hopes for the democratisation of Morocco. He then exiled himself to Paris, where he died of cancer in 2007.

 Career 
Basri came from a poor rural family originally from a village near Settat. His father emigrated to Rabat to work as a "Chaouch", a low rank warden in the administration. Driss Basri never completed secondary school (he did not obtain the Baccalauréat) and joined the police as an officer. Thanks to a relative from Casablanca who was the friend and director of the cabinet of General Oufkir, he was promoted in the early 1960s, as the director of the cabinet of Ahmed Dlimi, who supervised the Moroccan secret police (DST, then named CAB1). This was during an era which saw the "disappearance" of Socialist opponent Mehdi Ben Barka in 1965 in Paris. Aged 24, he was following in parallel law studies, and graduated in the University of Grenoble in France. Dlimi advised Basri that if he was to be further promoted he needed a degree, he then enrolled in university and obtained a bachelor in law.

In 1973, he censored Mohamed Choukri's autobiography, For Bread Alone''.

Basri was then appointed as Secretary of state for Interior Affairs in 1974, becoming Ahmed Dlimi's right-hand man. Basri became the iron fist of Hassan II during the Years of Lead. In 1979, Driss Basri was promoted to the post of interior minister in the government of Ahmed Osman, a post he held in all successive governments until 1999. Beginning in 1985, he held the post of minister of information as well. He won the confidence of King Hassan II, and during his time in office, the Ministry of Interior came to be known as the "mother of all ministries".

He was considered by his detractors as a hindrance to the democratisation of Morocco in the 1980s and 1990s. He was accused of creating "administrative" parties to counter the traditional nationalist and popular parties, and of rigging elections in favour of loyalists. Under his term some demonstrations were harshly repressed by police, such as in 1981 in Casablanca and 1990 in Fes.

Exile and death 
Three months after King Mohammed VI acceded to the throne in 1999, succeeding Hassan II, Basri was at last discharged from his ministerial functions on 9 November 1999. He went to live in Paris. In March 2004, his Moroccan passport was withdrawn, leading Basri to become, in effect, an illegal alien in France. However, he still travelled internationally, and was not disturbed by the French police.

Basri reportedly had an animosity with Fouad Ali El Himma, the close influential friend of Mohammed VI (then crown prince). They had conflictual relations during the time in which El Himma worked at the ministry of the Interior.

Basri was heard by the judge Patrick Ramaël in May 2006, as a witness, concerning Mehdi Ben Barka's kidnapping. Basri declared to the magistrate that he had not been linked to the Ben Barka Affair. He added that "it is possible that the King knew. It is legitimate to think that de Gaulle possessed some information…" 

Driss Basri died in Paris on 27 August 2007. He was buried in Rabat on 29 August; The Interior Minister in 2007 Chakib Benmoussa was the only representative of the government at the funeral.

See also 
 Chakib Benmoussa
 Khelli Henna Ould Rachid
 History of Morocco

References

1938 births
2007 deaths
Directors of intelligence agencies
Government ministers of Morocco
Moroccan exiles
Deaths from cancer in France
People from Settat
Grenoble Alpes University alumni
Moroccan police officers
People of Moroccan intelligence agencies
Moroccan expatriates in France